Al-Rafidain University College is a private academic institution in higher education of public interest established on November 23, 1988. It was founded by The Iraqi Society for Statistical Sciences. The actual work study started in 1988/1989 and is considered one of the oldest private academic colleges in Iraq. The college awards bachelor's degrees in various scientific disciplines and is subject to the laws, regulations, instructions and regulations of the Ministry of Higher Education and Scientific Research through direct scientific and educational supervision on its various activities. Granted by the college recognized by that ministry.

Al-Rafidain University currently includes thirteen medical, engineering and scientific departments. The duration of the study in each stage is four years. The student is awarded a bachelor's degree in engineering and science in his specialization, except for the Department of Dentistry and Pharmacy. The academic system in the college is an annual system consisting of two semesters except for the pharmacy department, which apply the semester system. The certificates granted to the student are approved by the Ministry of Higher Education and Scientific Research and other relevant ministries for the purposes of recruitment and studies. The university has a number of different faculties, including 12 medical labs, 25 engineering and scientific laboratories, as well as 60 classrooms and 40 halls in another building. The college also has artistic, cultural and poetry activities as well as annual scientific conferences and seminars as well as sports activities.

College Buildings 

College now has three buildings, the main building located in Palestine Avenue / Baghdad distract, which contains the Deanship of the college and some engineering and scientific departments such as communications engineering and computer technology engineering, the second building located in AL- Banook Avenue / Baghdad district which contains other engineering and scientific departments such as cooling and air conditioning engineering, and the building of the dental hospital in the Cairo Avenue / Baghdad .

Faculties 

The college includes study in:

 Computer and Communications
 Computer Engineering
 Civil Engineering
 Telecommunications Engineering
 Law
 Pathology
 Business Management
 Computer Science
 Administration
 Accounting
 Refrigeration and Air Conditioning.
 Pharmacy
 Dentistry .

College Council 

The College Council (the highest scientific and administrative authority in the college) is formed according to the Iraqi Universities and Colleges Law. It consist of the dean of the college, the members of the heads of scientific departments, the dean's assistant and a representative of the Ministry of Higher Education and Scientific Research who meets the requirements of the college member and one of the specialized experts chosen by the Council The college is for a period of two years and is renewable once and one representative from the institution of the university who meets the requirements of the faculty. The College Council may summon, when necessary, to attend its sessions, the opinion of which is to use its competency and expertise and has no right to vote.
The College Council shall undertake the implementation of the college's scientific and educational policy and shall approve the curriculum and vocabulary of the academic subjects and the granting of certificates and degrees according to the laws and regulations in force. It will organize the scientific research and provide its requirements and the use of lecturers from inside and outside the country

See also 
 List of universities in Iraq

References

External links
 Ministry of Higher Education and Scientific Research list of private universities
 Al Rafidain University College

Rafidain
Education in Baghdad
Educational institutions established in 1988
1988 establishments in Iraq